Tasmanian Conservation Trust is a Tasmania's oldest non-profit conservation organisation; it was formed in 1968. The Trust has a comprehensive and interactive website Tasmanian Conservation Trust and operates a Facebook page.

The Trust is an independent advocate and guardian for conservation and biodiversity in Tasmania.

The Trust publishes a quarterly journal Tasmanian Conservationist on current conservation issues, campaigns and news updates.

See also
Queensland Conservation Council

References

Further reading
 Armstrong, Lance J.E. (1997). Good God, He’s Green! A History of Tasmanian Politics 1989-1996. Wahroonga, N.S.W., Pacific Law Press. 
 Lines, William J. (2006) Patriots : defending Australia's natural heritage  St. Lucia, Qld. : University of Queensland Press, 2006.

External links
 Tasmanian Conservation Trust

Nature conservation organisations based in Australia
1968 establishments in Australia
Environmental organisations based in Tasmania